Matilda of Flanders ( 1031 – 2 November 1083) was Queen of England and Duchess of Normandy by marriage to William the Conqueror, and regent of Normandy during his absences from the duchy. She was the mother of ten children who survived to adulthood, including two kings, William II and Henry I.

In 1031, Matilda was born into the House of Flanders, the second daughter of Count Baldwin V of Flanders and Adela of France. Flanders was of strategic importance to England and most of Europe as a "stepping stone between England and the Continent" necessary for strategic trade and for keeping the Scandinavian Intruders from England. In addition, her mother was the daughter of Robert II of France. For these reasons Matilda was of grander birth than William, who was illegitimate, and, according to some more romantic tellings of the story, she initially refused his proposal on this account. Her descent from the Anglo-Saxon royal House of Wessex was also to become a useful card. Like many royal marriages of the period, it breached the rules of consanguinity, then at their most restrictive (to seven generations or degrees of relatedness); Matilda and William were third-cousins once removed. She was about 20 when they married in 1051/2; William was some four years older, and had been Duke of Normandy since he was about eight (in 1035).

The marriage appears to have been successful, and William is not recorded to have had any bastards. Matilda was about 35, and had already borne most of her children, when William embarked on the Norman conquest of England, sailing in his flagship Mora, which Matilda had given him. She governed the Duchy of Normandy in his absence, joining him in England only after more than a year, and subsequently returning to Normandy, where she spent most of the remainder of her life, while William was mostly in his new kingdom. Matilda served as regent in Normandy during the absence of William six times: in 1066–1067, in 1067–1068, in 1069, in 1069–1072, in 1074 and, finally, in 1075–1076. She was about 52 when she died in Normandy in 1083.

Apart from governing Normandy and supporting her brother's interests in Flanders, Matilda took a close interest in the education of her children, who were unusually well educated for contemporary royalty. The boys were tutored by the Italian Lanfranc, who was made Archbishop of Canterbury in 1070, while the girls learned Latin in Sainte-Trinité Abbey in Caen, founded by William and Matilda as part of the papal dispensation allowing their marriage.

Rumours of romances
There were rumours that Matilda had been in love with the English ambassador to Flanders and with the great Anglo-Saxon thegn Brictric, son of Algar, who (according to the account by the Continuator of Wace and others) in his youth declined her advances. Whatever the truth of the matter, years later she is said to have used her authority to confiscate Brictric's lands and throw him into prison, where he died.

Marriage
Matilda, or Maud, was the daughter of Baldwin V, Count of Flanders, and Adela, herself daughter of King Robert II of France.

According to legend, when the Norman duke William the Bastard (later called the Conqueror) sent his representative to ask for Matilda's hand in marriage, she told the representative that she was far too high-born to consider marrying a bastard. After hearing this response, William rode from Normandy to Bruges, found Matilda on her way to church, dragged her off her horse by her long braids, threw her down in the street in front of her flabbergasted attendants and rode off. Some narrations of this event also state that William rolled Matilda in the mud and badly beat her before galloping away.

Another version of the story states that William rode to Matilda's father's house in Lille, threw her to the ground in her room (again, by her braids) and hit her (or violently battered her) before leaving. Naturally, Baldwin took offence at this; but, before they could draw swords, Matilda settled the matter by refusing to marry anyone but William; even a papal ban by Pope Leo IX at the Council of Reims on the grounds of consanguinity did not dissuade her. A papal dispensation was finally awarded in 1059 by Pope Nicholas II. Lanfranc, at the time prior of Bec Abbey, negotiated the arrangement in Rome and it came only after William and Matilda agreed to found two churches as penance.

Duchess of Normandy
When William was preparing to invade England, Matilda outfitted a ship, the Mora, out of her own funds and gave it to him. Additionally, William gave Normandy to his wife during his absence. Matilda successfully guided the duchy through this period in the name of her fourteen-year-old son; no major uprisings or unrest occurred.

Even after William conquered England and became its king, it took her more than a year to visit the kingdom. Despite William's conquest, she spent most of her time in Normandy, governing the duchy, supporting her brother's interests in Flanders, and sponsoring ecclesiastic houses there. Only one of her children was born in England; Henry was born in Yorkshire when Matilda accompanied her husband in the Harrying of the North. She arrived in England in April 1068 and was crowned alongside William, who was re-crowned at the same time in order to demand the court's respect.

Queen of England
Matilda was crowned queen on 11 May 1068 in Westminster during the feast of Pentecost, in a ceremony presided over by the archbishop of York. Three new phrases were incorporated to cement the importance of a queen, stating that she was divinely placed by God, shared in royal power, and blessed her people by her power and virtue.

For many years it was thought that Matilda had some involvement in the creation of the Bayeux Tapestry (commonly called La Tapisserie de la Reine Mathilde in French), but historians no longer believe that; it seems to have been commissioned by William's half-brother Odo, Bishop of Bayeux, and made by English artists in Kent.

Matilda and William had nine or ten children together. He is believed to have been faithful to her and never produced a child outside their marriage; there is no evidence of any illegitimate children born to William. Despite her royal duties, Matilda was deeply invested in her children's well-being. All were known for being remarkably educated. Her daughters were educated and taught to read Latin at Sainte-Trinité in Caen, founded by Matilda and William in response to the recognition of their marriage. For her sons, she secured Lanfranc, Archbishop of Canterbury of whom she was an ardent supporter. Both she and William approved of the Archbishop's desire to revitalise the Church.

William was furious when he discovered she sent large sums of money to their exiled son Robert. She effected a truce between them at Easter 1080.

She stood as godmother for Matilda of Scotland, who would become Queen of England after marrying Matilda's son Henry I. During the christening, the baby pulled Queen Matilda's headdress down on top of herself, which was seen as an omen that the younger Matilda would be queen some day as well.

Death and burial 

Matilda fell ill during the summer of 1083 and died on 2 November 1083. Her husband was present for her final confession. William swore to give up hunting, his favorite sport, to express his grief after the death of his wife. He himself died four years later in 1087.

Contrary to the common belief that she was buried at St. Stephen's, also called l'Abbaye-aux-Hommes in Caen, Normandy, where William was eventually buried, she is entombed in Caen at l'Abbaye aux Dames, which is the community of Sainte-Trinité. Of particular interest is the 11th-century slab, a sleek black ledger stone decorated with her epitaph, marking her grave at the rear of the church. In contrast, the grave marker for William's tomb was replaced as recently as the beginning of the 19th century.

Over time Matilda's tomb was desecrated and her original coffin destroyed. Her remains were placed in a sealed box and reburied under the original black slab. In 1959 Matilda's incomplete skeleton was examined and her femur and tibia were measured to determine her height. However, as a result of this examination she was misreported as being  leading to the myth that she was extremely small.

Children
Matilda and William had four sons and at least five daughters. The birth order of the boys is clear, but no source gives the relative order of birth of the daughters.

 Robert (c.1053 – 10 February 1134), Duke of Normandy, married Sybil of Conversano, daughter of Geoffrey of Conversano.
 Richard, (c.1055 – c.1069-74)
Adeliza (or Adelida, Adelaide), (c.1057, – c.1073), reportedly betrothed to Harold II of England, probably a nun of St Léger at Préaux.
Cecilia (or Cecily), (c.1058 – 1127). Abbess of Holy Trinity, Caen.
 William Rufus, (c.1060 –  2 August 1100), King of England, killed in the New Forest.
Matilda (c.1061 – c.1086) possibly died much later (according to Trevor Foulds's suggestion that she was identical to Matilda d'Aincourt).
 Constance (c.1062 – 1090), married Alan IV Fergent, Duke of Brittany.
 Adela, (c.1067 – 1137), married Stephen, Count of Blois. Mother of King Stephen of England.
 Henry (late 1068 – 1 December 1135) King of England, married Edith of Scotland, daughter of Malcolm III of Scotland. His second wife was Adeliza of Louvain.
 Agatha, betrothed to Harold II of England, Alfonso VI of Castile, and possibly Herbert I, Count of Maine, but died unmarried.

References

Notes

Citations

Sources

 

 
 

 

|-

1030s births
1083 deaths
Year of birth uncertain
11th-century English people
11th-century English women
11th-century French people
11th-century French women
11th-century women rulers
Duchesses of Normandy
English Roman Catholics
English royal consorts
French Roman Catholics
House of Flanders
William the Conqueror
Medieval letter writers